Jae-wook  is a Korean masculine given name. Its meaning depends on the hanja used to write each syllable of the name. There are 20 hanja with the reading "jae" and 11 hanja with the reading "wook" on the South Korean government's official list of hanja which may be registered for use in given names.

People with this name include:
Yun Jae-uk (fl. 1940s), South Korean politician; see List of members of the South Korean Constituent Assembly, 1948–50
Ko Jae-wook (born 1951), South Korean footballer and football manager
Ahn Jae-wook (born 1971), South Korean actor and singer
Kim Jae-wook (born 1983), South Korean actor and model
Ahn Se-ha (born Ahn Jae-wook, 1986), South Korean actor
No Jae-wook (born 1992), South Korean volleyball player
Lee Jae-wook (born 1998), South Korean actor and model

See also
List of Korean given names

References

Korean masculine given names